Infectious Disease Hospital (Angoda Fever Hospital) widely known as the "IDH Hospital", is a government hospital in Angoda, Sri Lanka. It is now known as National Institute of Infectious Diseases. The hospital had a bed strength around 220 in 2017, which is sometimes less than the total number of admitted patients. It's mainly based on infectious disease control over country.

It is a high service level hospital focused on infection control, HIV and other Infectious Diseases. A specialised unit established for Dengue management in 2010. It has become the best institute for Dengue Management In the Colombo district. It's started mainly focus Dengue treatment but now it is mainly targeting COVID-19 virus treatment after on 27 January, the first confirmed case reported in Sri Lanka, a 44-year-old Chinese woman from Hubei Province in China. She was admitted to the National Institute of Infection Diseases. In 2020 COVID-19 pandemic period project consisted of adding 16 new  fully furnished bedrooms that provide 32 beds and adequate restroom facilities.

References 

Central government hospitals in Sri Lanka
Hospitals in Colombo District